Imam's Line is a term equivalent to the party line approved by the "Imam"—Ayatollah Khomeini in the Iranian revolutionary terminology.

During early years of the revolution, various groups claimed to follow the line such as Islamist Combatant Clergy Association, Movement of Militant Muslims and Mojahedin of the Islamic Revolution Organization, as well as the communist Tudeh Party of Iran.

Groups using the name 
 Muslim Student Followers of the Imam's Line
 Coalition of Imam's Line groups
 Assembly of the Forces of Imam's Line
 Front of Followers of the Line of the Imam and the Leader

References

Ruhollah Khomeini
Political terminology of Iran